The 1974 World Men's Handball Championship was the eighth team handball World Championship. It was held in East Germany between 28 February-10 March 1974. Romania won the championship.

Teams

Preliminary round

Group A

Group B

Group C

Group D

Placement Round (9-12 pos.) 
The four third placed teams from the preliminary round played a round robin tournament for positions 9-12.

Second round

Group 1

Group 2

7th / 8th place 

 (1) -  In East Berlin

5th / 6th place 

 (1) -  In East Berlin

3rd / 4th place 

 (1) -  In East Berlin

Final 

 (1) -  In East Berlin

Final standings 

Source: International Handball Federation

World Handball Championship tournaments
H
H
World Mens Handball Championship, 1974
February 1974 sports events in Europe
March 1974 sports events in Europe